Richard Joseph Carmichael (born November 27, 1979) is an American former professional motocross and stock car racing driver. He competed in the AMA Motocross Championships from 1997 to 2007 and in NASCAR from 2008 to 2011. Carmichael is notable for winning the AMA 450cc motocross national championship seven times and, the AMA Supercross Championship 450cc class five times. His unrivaled successes in the sport of motocross have given him the nickname "The GOAT"; standing for Greatest of All Time.

His NASCAR career began with him competing full-time in the East Series in 2008 for Ken Schrader Racing, as well as part-time in what is now the ARCA Menards Series for Kevin Harvick Incorporated. He drove in the NASCAR Camping World Truck Series full-time for three years, first with KHI for most of his rookie season in 2009, and then the rest of his time there with Turner Motorsports. He also made select starts in what is now the Xfinity Series as well as ARCA for Turner in 2010 and 2011.

Racing career

Motocross/supercross
After a dominant amateur career, Carmichael made his professional debut in 1997 for the Splitfire Pro Circuit Kawasaki team. In his rookie Supercross effort, he showed promising speed, winning multiple main events. However, crashes and inconsistency ultimately cost him the title of Suzuki's Tim Ferry. Outdoors, Carmichael was more consistent, beating defending champion Steve Lamson for the overall win at round 1, and went on to win the overall 125cc title. 

In 1998 Carmichael proved his ability to dominate indoors as well, winning all 8 of the 125cc East coast Supercross rounds, as well as the "East/West Shoot-Out" event. Outdoors, he defended his title comfortably despite early challenges from Lamson, John Dowd, and Mike Brown.

Carmichael jumped to the 250 class for Supercross in 1999 with the Factory Kawasaki team. He had moderate success in the early rounds, including top 5 finishes, but frequent crashes throughout the remainder of the season resulted in a finish outside of the top 10 of the final standings. For the outdoor season, he remained in the 125cc class, which he won handily for a 3rd consecutive year.
In 2000, Carmichael moved to the 250 class full-time. He showed more consistency in Supercross, getting his first premier class race win at Daytona. He finished 5th overall in the final standings. Carmichael again displayed his outdoor prowess in the 2000 AMA Motocross championship, winning the title in his rookie year despite challenges from Sebastien Tortelli.

Leading into the 2001 Supercross season, Carmichael showed a newfound commitment to his physical conditioning, bringing on former professional cyclist Aldon Baker to oversee his training regimen. After contests in the early rounds from defending 250 Supercross Champion Jeremy McGrath, Carmichael established himself as the new leader of the class, winning 13 of 15 rounds along with the championship. He then continued his streak of outdoor titles as well, fending off challengers Sébastien Tortelli and Kevin Windham.

Carmichael moved to a new manufacturer, Honda, for the 2002 season. Despite a violent crash in round 1 of Supercross, he quickly rebounded and went on to win 11 of 16 rounds, as well his second 250 title over runner-up David Vuillemin.  In the 2002 outdoor championship, Carmichael won an unprecedented 24 of 24 motos to take his third consecutive 250 outdoor title.

2003–2007

In 2003, Carmichael won both Supercross and National titles again; winning 7 races indoors where he faced a stiff challenge from Chad Reed. He won the National title again with 9 race wins over Windham.

In 2004, Carmichael was injured for the Supercross season, he had a knee injury (torn ligaments/meniscus) but came back for the Motocross season to record his second perfect season; winning 24 of the 24 motos he raced and all 12 overalls on his Honda CRF 450; his first effort on a 4-stroke bike.

Carmichael entered the 2005 season as the underdog, due to missing the prior season with the knee injury, now as a Suzuki factory rider. In what was projected as "the perfect storm", James "Bubba" Stewart made his debut in the premier 250cc class, along with perennial contenders Chad Reed and Kevin Windham, Carmichael triumphantly regained his Supercross title, with seven victories to Reed's five, Stewart's three, and Windham's one. Later that summer, Carmichael won all 12 events in the 250cc Outdoor National Championship again; winning 22 of 24 motos on an RMZ450. Carmichael also scored the US Open of Supercross title and led Team USA to a convincing victory at the Motocross des Nations.

Carmichael campaigned the 2006 Supercross season aboard an RMZ450; his first attempt at indoor competition on a four-stroke. It was the most exciting series battle in recent memory. There were multiple points lead changes and race winners, and Carmichael, Reed, and Stewart all entered the Las Vegas finale within 5 points of each other. With Carmichael and Reed tied for the lead (316 points), and Stewart (311) only 5 points behind them, it was a close race. Carmichael rode to a safe second-place finish behind Stewart and ended the series with 6 victories and his fifth Supercross championship. He indicated that 2006 would be his last full-time season and planned to retire the following year.

In the 2006 Outdoor National Championship season, Carmichael once again dominated all comers, including James Stewart, in winning 9 races and placing second twice. However, at the season finale at Glen Helen Raceway, Carmichael suffered a bad crash while challenging James Stewart for the win and was unable to finish the race. Carmichael had already clinched the overall championship at the prior round. In the crash, he sustained a shoulder injury and was unable to compete in the Motocross of Nations race in England. Ivan Tedesco replaced him on Team USA and helped lead the American team to victory.

As planned, Carmichael raced only a partial schedule in 2007. He would only race select events for Team Makita Suzuki while pursuing his new stock car career. Carmichael finished with two Supercross wins and six Outdoor National wins, winning every race he entered. Carmichael capped his career with a winning performance at the X-Games and a victory with Team USA at the Motocross of Nations in Budds Creek, Maryland.

X Games
Carmichael won the gold in Supercross at the X Games in 2007, won gold in Step Up in 2008, was jointly given the gold medal in the same event in 2009 with Ronnie Renner. In 2019, he won the bronze medal in Real Moto.

Stock car racing

In 2007, Carmichael signed a driver development contract with Ginn Racing, which would later be merged with Dale Earnhardt, Inc. Under the tutelage of veteran Mark Martin, Carmichael started his transition to stock cars by racing late models throughout the country. With backing from Monster Energy, Carmichael later transitioned to Ken Schrader Racing, and ran a few races in the Camping World East Series, including the prestigious Toyota All-Star Showdown at Toyota Speedway in Irwindale, California. In 2009, Carmichael was tabbed by Sprint Cup Series driver Kevin Harvick to drive the No. 4 Chevrolet Silverado in 18 races for Harvick's team, Kevin Harvick, Inc. Though the transition wasn't easy, Carmichael finished 22nd in Truck Series points that year. In 2010, Carmichael and Monster left KHI and went to Turner Motorsports, where he would gain 9 top tens en route to finishing 13th in the points. Carmichael also made his Nationwide Series debut at Kansas Speedway, starting 12th and finishing 18th. Carmichael returned to Turner for 2011, and split the No. 30 Chevrolet in the Nationwide Series with teammates James Buescher, Reed Sorenson, Jason Leffler and Mark Martin.

On September 2, 2011, Carmichael achieved his first career pole at Atlanta Motor Speedway in the Camping World Truck Series.

Consulting
On July 19, 2021, Carmichael entered into a partnership with Triumph Motorcycles.  Along with World Enduro champion Ivan Cervantes, they are tasked with helping develop the prototypes for the new line of off-road motorcycles by Triumph for use in motorcross and supercross.

Sponsors

Current
 Fox Racing
 Monster Energy (2006–present)
 Triumph Motorcycles (2021–present)

Past
 Kawasaki motorcycles (1997–2001, 2020–2021)
 Suzuki (2005–2020)
 Honda Racing Corporation (2002–2004)

Other activities
In 2009, for the BBC show Top Gear, Ken Block took James May out for Gymkhana-style driving at Block's stunt course at Inyokern Airport; an operational California airport. Carmichael appeared in a supporting role, to which Block described Carmichael as 'a good friend'.

He currently works on AMA Monster Energy Supercross Broadcasts on NBC with Leigh Diffey or Todd Harris, Daniel Blair, and Will Christien.

Awards
He was voted 2009 Camping World Truck Series Most Popular Driver.

In 2015, he was inducted in the Motorsports Hall of Fame of America.

Motorsports career results

AMA Motocross / Supercross

 *Ricky retired from full time racing at the end of 2006. In 2007, he raced a partial schedule in both SX and MX as a farewell tour.

Titles

1997 AMA 125cc/Lites Outdoor National Motocross Champion (Kawasaki)
1998 AMA 125cc/Lites East Coast Supercross Champion (Kawasaki) - Perfect season: 8-0
1998 AMA 125cc/Lites Outdoor National Motocross Champion (Kawasaki)
1999 AMA 125cc/Lites Outdoor National Motocross Champion (Kawasaki)
2000 AMA Motocross Champion (Kawasaki)
2001 AMA Supercross Champion (Kawasaki)
2001 AMA Motocross Champion (Kawasaki)
2002 AMA Supercross Champion (Honda)
2002 AMA Motocross Champion (Honda) - Perfect season: 24-0
2003 AMA Supercross Champion (Honda)
2003 AMA Motocross Champion (Honda)
2004 AMA Motocross Champion (Honda) - Perfect season: 24-0
2005 AMA Supercross Champion (Suzuki)
2005 AMA Motocross Champion (Suzuki)
2006 AMA Supercross Champion (Suzuki)
2006 AMA Motocross Champion  (Suzuki)

 Wins

12 Wins in 125/250 AMA Supercross
26 Wins in 125/250 AMA Motocross: 8 (1997), 8 (1998), 9 (1999), 1 (2001),
48 Wins in 250/450 AMA Supercross: 1 (2000), 14 (2001), 11 (2002), 7 (2003), 7 (2005), 6 (2006), 2 (2007)
76 Wins in 250/450 AMA Motocross:  9 (2000), 7 (2001), 12 (2002), 9 (2003), 12 (2004), 12 (2005), 9 (2006), 6 (2007)
162 Wins in AMA SX/MX: 8 (1997), 8 (1998), 9 (1999), 10 (2000), 22 (2001), 23 (2002), 12 (2004), 19 (2005), 15 (2006), 8 (2007)

Other motocross / supercross
2000 Motocross des Nations Champion (Team USA)
2001 U.S. Open of Supercross Champion
2005 FIM SX1 World Supercross Champion 
2005 Motocross des Nations Champion (Team USA) 
2005 U.S. Open of Supercross Champion
2007 Motocross of Nations Champion (Team USA)

NASCAR
(key) (Bold – Pole position awarded by qualifying time. Italics – Pole position earned by points standings or practice time. * – Most laps led.)

Nationwide Series

Camping World Truck Series

Camping World East Series

ARCA Racing Series
(key) (Bold – Pole position awarded by qualifying time. Italics – Pole position earned by points standings or practice time. * – Most laps led.)

References

External links

 
 
 
 Ricky Carmichael Motocross.com Profile
 Career Motocross Results - Ricky Carmichael

1979 births
AMA Motocross Championship National Champions
American motocross riders
Living people
NASCAR drivers
Sportspeople from Clearwater, Florida
Racing drivers from Florida
X Games athletes
Motorsport announcers
Leon High School alumni